The Grail is a 1923 American silent Western film directed by Colin Campbell and written by Charles Kenyon. The film stars Dustin Farnum, Peggy Shaw, Carl Stockdale, Frances Raymond, James Gordon and Jack Rollens. The film was released on October 14, 1923, by Fox Film Corporation.

Cast       
 Dustin Farnum as Chic Shelby
 Peggy Shaw as Dora Bledsoe
 Carl Stockdale as Reverend Bledsoe
 Frances Raymond as Mrs. Bledsoe
 James Gordon as James Trammel
 Jack Rollens as John Trammel
 Frances Hatton as Mrs. Trammel
 Alma Bennett as Susie Trammel
 Léon Bary as Sam Hervey

References

External links
 

1923 films
1923 Western (genre) films
Fox Film films
Films directed by Colin Campbell
American black-and-white films
Silent American Western (genre) films
1920s English-language films
1920s American films